The 1998–99 Tetley's Bitter Rugby Union County Championship was the 99th edition of England's County Championship rugby union club competition. 

Cornwall won their third title after defeating Gloucestershire in the final.

Final

See also
 English rugby union system
 Rugby union in England

References

Rugby Union County Championship
County Championship (rugby union) seasons